Charles Reddock was a Scottish professional football left half of the 1920s. Born in Rutherglen, he joined Gillingham from Shettleston in 1925 and went on to make 29 appearances for the club in The Football League. He left to join Brentford in 1926 and made 9 appearances in a four-year spell, before finishing his career with Thames.

Career statistics

References

1902 births
Scottish footballers
Sportspeople from Rutherglen
Gillingham F.C. players
Brentford F.C. players
Year of death missing
Glasgow United F.C. players
English Football League players
Thames A.F.C. players
Association football midfielders
Footballers from South Lanarkshire